This is a list of Emporia State Hornets football season records. The Emporia State Hornets football team is the football team of Emporia State University, located in the American city of Emporia, Kansas. The team competes as a Mid-America Intercollegiate Athletics Association (MIAA) at the NCAA Division II level.

Since the program's beginning in 1893, they have been known as the Normals, the Teachers, the Yaps, and the Hornets. Since 1937, Emporia State's football team has played in Francis G. Welch Stadium, named after the long-time coach and athletic director at Emporia State.

Emporia State has won 16 conference championships: six in the Kansas Conference, six in the Central Intercollegiate Athletic Conference, two in the Great Plains Athletic Conference, one in the Central States Intercollegiate Conference, and one in the Mid-America Intercollegiate Athletics Association.

Seasons

|-
| colspan="8" style="text-align:center; "| 

|- style="background: #231F20;"
| colspan="8" style="text-align:center;"| 

|-
| colspan="8" style="text-align:center;"| 

|-
| colspan="8" style="text-align:center;  "| 
|-

|-
| colspan="8" style="text-align:center; "| 

Sources:

References

Emporia State Hornets

Emporia State Hornets football seasons